To Love or Not is a 2011 Chinese romance film written and directed by Jiang Cheng and starring Alex Fong, Li Xiaoran, Kathy Chow, Li Yuan, and Song Xiaoying. The film tells the story of a war correspondent and photographer Su Dong and a stewardess Gu Ting who meet on a journey in Yunnan province, they separated after a night of romantic passion, and then meet again in Beijing. The film premiered in China on July 15, 2011.

Cast
 Alex Fong as Su Dong, a war correspondent and photographer in Afghanistan. He is shot dead by an Afghan child named Ahsuka.
 Li Xiaoran as Gu Ting, a stewardess. She met Su Dong and has a one night stand while traveling in Yunnan province.
 Kathy Chow as Song Mei, an editor, Gu Ting's best friend.
 Li Yuan as Sha Sha, Su Dong's girlfriend. She breaks up with Su Dong angrily because he fells in love with Gu Ting.
 Song Xiaoying as Gu Ting's mother. She got divorced when her daughter Gu Ting was 8 years old.
 Ding Yongdai as Dan Yang
 Qiao Hong as Dan Yang's wife.

Production
This film was shot in Yunnan and Beijing.

Release
The film was released on July 15, 2011 in China.

Reception
Douban, a major Chinese media rating site, gave the drama 5.1 out of 10.

References

External links
 
 

2011 films
2010s Mandarin-language films
Chinese romance films
Films shot in Beijing
Films set in Beijing
Films shot in Yunnan
Films set in Yunnan